Hypercompe obsolescens is a moth of the family Erebidae first described by George Hampson in 1916. It is found in Peru.

References

Hypercompe
Moths described in 1916